Arthur Price Smith (3 December 1857 – 3 June 1937) was an English cricketer active from 1880 to 1894 who played for Lancashire and Nottinghamshire. He appeared in 52 first-class matches as a righthanded batsman who bowled right arm medium pace. He scored 1,508 runs with a highest score of 124 and held 32 catches. He took 44 wickets with a best analysis of five for 23.

References

1857 births
1937 deaths
English cricketers
Lancashire cricketers
Nottinghamshire cricketers